Ernest-Camille Bock (11 November 1894 – 10 December 1952) was a Belgian lawyer and colonial administrator. He was governor of Orientale Province in the Belgian Congo from 1945 to 1952.

Early years (1894–1927)

Ernest-Camille Bock was born on 11 November 1894 in Schaerbeek, Belgium.
He studied the humanities at the Royal Athenaeum in Malines.
During World War I (1914–1918) he escaped when Belgium was invaded by the Germans, and enlisted as a volunteer.
For his conduct in action he received several citations and was awarded the Croix de Guerre with palm.
He was demobilized in August 1919 and enrolled at the University of Liège.
In 1924 he obtained a doctorate in law. 
He was registered with the Bar Association near the Brussels Court of Appeal for two and a half years.

Bock married Suzanne Anciaux.

Colonial administrator

Bock enrolled in the legal section of the Colonial School of the Ministry of Colonies.
After his studies he passed the examinations and was appointed Legal Advisor to the Government of the Belgian Congo.
He served in this role in Stanleyville, capital of the Orientale Province, from April 1927 until March 1933.
At the same time he was in charge of the Administrative Service of Justice.
In August 1933 he was put in charge of the Legal Service at the General Government in Léopoldville.
During World War II (1939–1945) he had to deal with many problems of internal and international law.

Governor General Pierre Ryckmans found Bock a useful co-worker.
Due to his services and great administrative experience, in June 1945 Bock was appointed governor of Oriental Province, based in Stanleyville.
He held office until 29 June 1950, when he was temporarily replaced by Joseph-Paul Brasseur.
He served again from 8 October 1951.
He performed his duties with enthusiasm, authority and tact.
He traveled widely in his province so he could see the social and economic changes and encourage his people.
After a long day's work, on 10 December 1952 he died in Stanleyville of a sudden embolism. 
He was succeeded as governor by Luc Breuls de Tiecken.

Clippings, diaries, correspondence, notes, etc. by Bock were collected by Maurice Martin de Ryck, governor of Équateur Province, and are held by Michigan State University Libraries Special Collections.

Decorations

Decorations included:

 Croix de guerre (1914–18) with palms;
 Knight of the Order of Leopold II with swords;
 Serbian Silver Medal for Bravery;
 Commander of the Order of Leopold;
 Officer of the Royal Order of the Lion.

Notes

Sources

 

1894 births
1952 deaths
Governors of Orientale Province
Governors of provinces of the Belgian Congo
People from Schaerbeek